Plaza Building may refer to:

Plaza Building (Patterson, California), listed on the National Register of Historic Places
Plaza Building (Des Moines, Iowa)
Plaza Building (Jackson, Mississippi)